Montgomeryville is the name of some places:

United States
 Montgomeryville, Pennsylvania, a census-designated place
 Montgomeryville, Wisconsin, an unincorporated community

See also
 Montgomery (disambiguation)